Drive is a 2019 Indian Hindi-language action-heist film written, edited and directed by Tarun Mansukhani and produced by Hiroo Yash Johar, Karan Johar and Apoorva Mehta under Dharma Productions. Starring Sushant Singh Rajput, Jacqueline Fernandez, Vikramjeet Virk, Sapna Pabbi, Pankaj Tripathi and Boman Irani the story of the film revolves around the manhunt for an infamous 'King' for a robbery of 300 kilograms of gold. An undercover agent infiltrates a street racing gang who is chasing the King. The film was scheduled to release on 7 September 2018, but was pushed to 28 June 2019, ultimately to not see a theatrical release. It was directly released on Netflix on 1 November 2019. It marked the last film of Rajput before his death on 14 June 2020.

Plot
Vibha Singh is a corrupt bureaucrat in the Accounts Department of the Indian Government who pushes many of her clients into giving her the "percentages" of their money which may either have been stolen or confiscated. With the support of her assistant Hamid Ibrahim, she continues to do so and hides the money in a basement of the Rashtrapati Bhavan, which is only known to her, and resumes her lifestyle until she receives news from Kirit Ojha, the Honorary Secretary to the Prime Minister, that her help is needed critically by the Prime Minister for a certain task. Ojha sends his man, Irfan Ali to work with them and start an investigation from within their department to avoid being caught, as the investigation in question is against the notorious criminal King, who has recently stolen jewels from a jewelry house owner Mr. Mehta, and has claimed that his next target would be the Rashtrapati Bhavan. For the same, a hacker from the technical department, named Raj Naik, is chosen to decipher messages of the gang.

Hamid and Irfan go on to investigate a street racing gang whose members have been striving hard to get close to King. The gang, composed of the leader, Tara Loha, and her associates and friends Bikki Kumar and Naina Sethi, indulges in illegal street racing. While Irfan speculates that a certain Arjun can infiltrate the gang and earn more information on King, a man appears out of nowhere. The man, Samar, disrupts Tara when she tries to meet a recent street race winner, and wins Tara's trust by regaining the car given to him along with some money, when he loses both upon being caught by a policeman, Mukhtar Rathore. Through the very course of events that follows suit, Samar bonds well with Tara, Bikki, and Naina, holidaying with the group in Israel for the next few days, when Irfan realizes, along with Singh and Hamid, that several messages that they have been receiving ostensibly as customer care offer messages are actually coded messages. They ask Raj to decipher the rail code messages, and discover that King's loot is located near the Gopigunj police station. Tara receives the message and sets out with Bikki and Naina to retrieve it, with the police, headed by Irfan and Hamid, in hot pursuit, when it is revealed that the infiltrator, Arjun, was part of the street racing gatherings, and has been able to take the lead against the trio, but Tara, Bikki, and Naina are then saved by a mysterious entity, which is then revealed to be Samar himself. Admitting himself to be King, even as he used the name as a simple criminal alias to commit robberies, Samar gets the group going on the coveted Rashtrapati Bhavan robbery, which is aimed to get them their hands on Singh's money, and their plan begins to work, but days later, much close to the heist, Irfan realizes that Raj was actually allied with King, and puts him to interrogation, hampering the hacking aspects of the group's plan.

On the eve of the heist, Samar relays to Tara that he will legitimately convert the stolen money to diamonds and store them in the Museum of London, and even as Bikki and Naina get married, Samar gets an alternate plan ready to be executed. The heist works perfectly well when Irfan, Hamid, and Singh are put off their guard, with Singh being knocked unconscious and her money stolen, but during the mighty escape to the airport, Tara fools Samar and make sure that he is caught by the police, which is when Tara reveals to him that she is King, and it was impulsive for her to betray him for all his smartness. Irfan and Hamid catch up with Samar and arrest him.

Two months later, Tara has changed her identity to a random Shahida Khan, and goes to the Bank of London, with Bikki behind her, to store her diamonds in a vault. However, on the spot, she sees Samar, disguised as a certain Lakhan Sharma, the vault manager, and soon realizes that Peter Tulip (Irfan), who then appears before her, was actually Samar's boss, and that Samar was let in on as the early Ojha. A shocked Tara, along with a helpless Bikki, then walks away with Samar and Irfan into the vault.

Cast 
Sushant Singh Rajput as Samar
Jacqueline Fernandez as Tara
Vikramjeet Virk as Bikki 
Sapna Pabbi as Naina 
Boman Irani as Irfan 
Pankaj Tripathi as Hamid 
Vibha Chibber as Vibha Singh 
Kaustubh Kumar as Raj 
Gaurav Chaudhari as Arjun 
Anuj Jain as Feroz 
Bikramjeet Kanwarpal as Inspector Rathore
Ramesh Khanna as Mr. Mehta
Dimple Verma as Mr. Singhania

Production 
The New Indian Express reported that a party song for the film was being shot in Tel Aviv, Israel. Producer Karan Johar did not liked the film when the film was shot for the first time. So, a disappointed Johar decided to reshoot the film and this time also, Johar did not liked the film. So, it was decided that this film will not be released in theatres, instead, it will be released on OTT when Netflix bought the rights to the film.

Release
In January 2019 a teaser released with showcasing the release date 28 July 2019 but got later postponed and further sold to Netflix. The film was released on 1 November on Netflix. The film is the first original film from Dharma Productions to release on Netflix.

Soundtrack 

The music is composed by Tanishk Bagchi, Amartya Bobo Rahut and Javed-Mohsin, while lyrics are written by Siddhant Kaushal, Ozil Dalal, Tanishk Bagchi, and Danish Sabri.

Reception 

Bollywood Hungama gave 2 stars out of 5 and said, 'Drive gives a déjà vu of many other films in this genre and fails to impress on account of confusing and unconvincing plot.' The Free Press Journal rated the movie 1 and a half stars on five and reviewed, ""Drive" is a film without logic and also without magic. It reminds you Bollywood's days of unimaginative cinema are far from over."

Uday Bhatia of LiveMint called the movie a lazy heist thriller. Saibal Chatterjee of NDTV rated the movie 1 on 5 stars and wrote, "Drive is so utterly pointless that one wonders why on earth it is on a streaming platform. That is a mystery. It will take some doing to crack. In the meantime, steer clear!" Shubhra Gupta of The Indian Express rated the movie 1 and a half stars on five and wrote, "Drive seems to have been strung up with influences from Hollywood films featuring sharp racing, sleek cars, and canny 'chors’, but has none of the smarts it is aiming at." Jyoti Sharma Bawa of the Hindustan Times stated "Drive is a lot like the name of its villain – terribly dated. You could build up men named King when they were fighting off others called Lion (or, to be precise, Loin). The film, with its gyrating blondes and street racing, is trying so hard to be the uber-cool racing-heist film but its soul is stuck in the 80s. If it has a soul, that is." Prathyush Parasuraman of Film Companion stated "Uncaring for craft or clarity, 'Dharma Productions’ latest film is a welcome addition to the gang of movies-that-are-so-bad-they-are-good".

References

External links 
 
 

Films set in Mumbai
Indian action thriller films
Indian heist films
Films shot in Israel
Indian direct-to-video films
2010s Hindi-language films
Hindi-language Netflix original films
2019 direct-to-video films
2019 films
2019 action thriller films
2019 crime thriller films
Indian crime thriller films
2010s heist films
Films set in Tel Aviv
Films set in Israel
Fox Star Studios films